Any Wife is a lost 1922 American silent melodrama film directed by Herbert Brenon and starring Pearl White. It was produced and distributed by Fox Film Corporation.

Plot

As described in a film magazine, Myrtle Hill (White) is the wife of John Hill (Emery), a successful contractor who, because of his devotion to his work, he neglects his wife. He has to make a hurried business trip to San Francisco and wants his wife and child to accompany him. After debating the matter, the wife falls asleep and dreams that she has divorced her husband and married a draftsman. He mistreats her and casts her off for an actress. The actress, sympathizing with her, brings the wife face-to-face with this husband, but he turns against her. She attempts suicide by jumping from a high bridge into the water, but then wakes up with her hand in an aquarium. She hurriedly dresses and together with her little boy Cyril (Johnson) accompanies her husband on his trip.

Cast
Pearl White as Myrtle Hill
Holmes Herbert as Philip Gray
Gilbert Emery as Mr. John Hill
Lawrence Johnson as Cyril Hill
Augustus Balfour as Dr. Gaynor
Eulalie Jensen as Louise Farrata

References

External links

1922 films
American silent feature films
Lost American films
Films directed by Herbert Brenon
Fox Film films
American black-and-white films
Melodrama films
1922 drama films
Silent American drama films
1922 lost films
Lost drama films
1920s American films